In mathematics, the Zakharov system is a system of non-linear partial differential equations, introduced by Vladimir Zakharov in 1972 to describe the propagation of Langmuir waves in an ionized plasma. The system consists of a complex field u and a real field n satisfying the equations

See also 
 Resonant interaction; the Zakharov equation describes non-linear resonant interactions.

References

 Zakharov, V. E. (1968). Stability of periodic waves of finite amplitude on the surface of a deep fluid. Journal of Applied Mechanics and Technical Physics, 9(2), 190-194.
.

Partial differential equations
Waves in plasmas
Plasma physics
Gravity waves